

This was the tenth season of Barnes Football Club.  Barnes participated in the first season of the F.A. Cup, but were unable to progress further than the second round.  The club was eliminated by Hampstead Heathens after a replay, despite playing both matches at home with a man advantage.

FA Cup

Friendly matches

Athletic Sports
 Date: 16 March 1872
 Venue: Field of J. Johnstone, White Hart inn, Mortlake.
 Committee: O. D. Chapman (treasurer), W. M. Chinnery, H. Ellis, F. S. Gulstone, E. C. Highton, E. C. Morley, J. Powell (secretary), D. M. Roberts, P. Weston, R. W. Willis, G. B. Yapp.
 Events: 100 yards flat race, 400 yards flat race handicap, 1320 yards flat race handicap, two miles flat face handicap, 150 yards hurdles, one mile handicap steeplechase, five miles handicap steeplechase (run 2 March), mile-and-a-half handicap walking, high jump, long jump running, vaulting

Notes

Barnes F.C. seasons
Barnes